Norman Ellison (2 November 1929 – 1 October 1999) was an English footballer who played as a winger in the Football League for Tranmere Rovers.

References

External links

Tranmere Rovers F.C. players
Association football wingers
English Football League players
1929 births
1999 deaths
English footballers